Follow the Sun is an American television adventure series that aired on ABC from September 17, 1961, to April 8, 1962. The episodes follow a pair of freelance magazine writers based in Hawaii who seek out interesting stories while leading an active social life both on the mainland and aboard their boat, The Scuber. The series is characterized by a host of guest appearances by popular film and television actors.

Dell Comics issued a contemporaneous series of comic books based on the show in 1961 and 1962.

Production
The series was co-produced by Roy Huggins and Marion Hargrove at 20th Century Fox. The plotline was designed as a follow-up to Hong Kong, which Huggins had lately produced, "with two freelance journalists based in Honolulu encountering mystery and their fair share of beautiful women in their weekly Hawaiian adventures". Hargrove left the project after the fifth episode and Huggins reworked the cast list, downgrading Gary Lockwood from one of the reporters to a scout, and upgrading Brett Halsey to the journalist position. Huggins also began alternating the episodes to star one or the other of the two lead characters.

Cast

Barry Coe as Ben Gregory
Brett Halsey as Paul Templin
Gary Lockwood as Eric Jason
Gigi Perreau as Katherine Ann Richards
Jay Lanin as Lt. Frank Roper

Episodes

Guest stars
The series featured guest appearances by many popular film and television stars, including:
Yvonne Craig
James Dunn
Bill Erwin
Anne Helm
David Janssen
Sue Ane Langdon
Julie London
Jayne Mansfield

References

Sources

External links
Episode guide 

1961 American television series debuts
1962 American television series endings
American adventure television series
American Broadcasting Company original programming
Television series by 20th Century Fox Television
Television shows set in Hawaii
English-language television shows
Television shows about writers